A constitutional referendum, officially referred to as the referendum to lower the age of criminal responsibility, was held in Uruguay on 26 October 2014, alongside general elections. Voters were asked whether Article 43 of the Constitution should be amended to lower the age of criminal responsibility from 18 to 16. The proposal was rejected by 53% of voters.

Background
During the electoral campaign for the 2009 elections, security was a significant issue, with criticism of the Broad Front government from the two main opposition parties, the National Party and the Colorado Party, regarding its handling of the issue. Towards the second half of 2010, several bills had been created that were aimed at modifying the legal framework that governs crimes committed by young people between 16 and 18 years of age, either by toughening the penalties, judging them as adults, or maintaining their legal record once they came of age.

On 17 April 2012, the signatures aimed at enabling a plebiscite were delivered to the Electoral Court, which were verified on 6 September, exceeding the 250,000 (10% of those authorized to vote) necessary to hold the vote.

Results

References

2014 referendums
2014 in Uruguay
2014
Constitutional referendums in Uruguay
October 2004 events in South America